Ister, The Ister, or Der Ister may refer to:
The Danube river, known as the Ister in Ancient Greek (Ἴστρος) and Thracian
The Dniester river, known as the Ister in Thracian
"Der Ister", a poem by Friedrich Hölderlin
Hölderlin's Hymn "The Ister", a lecture course delivered by Martin Heidegger in 1942
Ister-class frigate, a group of screw frigates ordered for the Royal Navy in the early 1860s
The Ister (film), a 2004 film directed by David Barison and Daniel Ross
Tajuria ister, a butterfly of the family Lycaenidae

See also
:de:Donau#Namen und Etymologie, German etymology and similarly named rivers